The University of Algiers (Arabic:جامعة الجزائر – بن يوسف بن خـدة ), commonly called the Algiers 1 University, is a public research university located in Algiers, Algeria. It is the oldest and most prestigious university in Algeria. Emerging from a series of independent institutions in the 19th century, it was organized as a university in 1909 and profoundly reorganized in 2009.

History

The historical tradition of higher education in Algeria began in 1832, with the creation of the Higher School of Letters of Algiers, as a way to guarantee the teaching of Arabic and French languages, in the context of the French conquest of Algeria. In 1849 the institution opened campuses in Oran and Constantine, and was formally integrated into the regular French education system on December 20, 1879. Subsequently, the Superior School of Medicine and Pharmacy was created in 1833 (officialized on August 4, 1857); in 1868 the School of Sciences, and; in 1879 the School of Law. All were based in the city of Algiers.

In 1909 all educational institutions were turned into faculties. Soon after, in the same year, the faculties were united to form the University of Algiers.

The installation of the Free French government in Algiers, making it the capital in exile in 1942, is marked by the admission of a greater number of Muslim students, who in that year represent 11.4% of the total number of students. Algerian and French numbers would become equivalent only in 1961.

On May 19, 1956, the General Union of Algerian Muslim Students (UGEMA) called an indefinite student strike, which halted the academic courses and examinations at the University of Algiers, rallying support from the National Liberation Front.

On 7 June 1962 – just a month ahead of the Algerian independence referendum – the Organisation Armée Secrète (OAS), the movement of colonists opposing Algerian independence, set fire to the library building, destroying 500,000 books. The destruction of these books and the library was reported in the Arab world as a tactic of war or dirty war, known as scorched earth. Egypt, Iraq and Jordan condemned the arson and issued repudiation notes. It showed the savagery of the anti-independence movement would extend to removing and indeed destroying culture so long as Algeria intended to create its own national culture.

The 1971 higher education reform abolished the college system and grouped the different disciplines by affinities into departments and institutes. The reform decrees the progressive Arabization of the disciplines, starting with certain classes in the social sciences (initially, philosophy and history). On December 12, 1998, the college system was re-established.

In 2009 the university is subdivided into three new institutions. The most important, the University of Algiers Benyoucef Benkhedda (or Algiers 1 University), stands as heir to the historical-academic tradition. Meanwhile, are created:
Abou El Kacem Saadallah University (Algiers 2 University);
Brahim Soltane Chaibout University (Algiers 3 University).

In 2015, due to the state of degradation of the university's buildings, professors, students and supporters demanded that the university be classified as a national historical-architectural heritage. The Ministry of Culture responded to the claims in July 2015.

Library 
The library holds 800,000 volumes.

Notable faculty
 Fernand Braudel (1902-1985) - French historian
 John Peters Humphrey (1905-1995) - Canadian legal scholar
 André Chastagnol (1920-1996) - French historian
 Assia Djebar (1936-2015) - novelist, translator, film maker
 Ahmed Zaoui - Islamic scholar, obtained refugee status in New Zealand in 2014

Notable alumni

Arts and Science

 Jean Baptiste Paulin Trolard (1842-1910) - physician; the "vein of Trolard" (the superior anastomotic vein) was named after him
 Albert Camus (1913–1960) - writer and the awardee of the Nobel Prize for Literature in 1957.
 Paul Coste-Floret (1911-1979) law professor and politician
 Albert Memmi (1920-2020) - Tunisian scholar
 Suzanne Carrell (1923-2019) - educator
 Gabriel Camps (1927-2002) - archaeologist and social anthropologist
 Maurice Audin (1932-1957) - mathematician and political activist
 Fadéla M'rabet (born 1935) - writer and feminist.
 Fatima Gallaire (1944-2020) - author and playwright
 Youcef Saad (born 1950) - mathematician.
 Elias Zerhouni (born 1951) - Algerian-born American physician scientist radiologist and biomedical engineer.
 Saddek Rabah (born 1968) - University Professor and academic researcher.
 Kaouther Adimi (born 1986) - writer
 Abdelkader Rezig Elmokhadimi (1950-2022) - author and journalist.

Politics and Diplomacy
 Ferhat Abbas (1899-1985) - politician
 Mohamed Lamine Debaghine (1917-2003) - political activist
 Mehdi Ben Barka (1920-1965?) - Moroccan politician; disappeared in 1965
 Lakhdar Brahimi (born 1934) - UN diplomat and Algerian Minister of Foreign Affairs.
 Hassiba Ben Bouali (1938-1957) - political activist
 Ferhat Mehenni (born 1951) - political activist
 Ahmed Djoghlaf (born 1953) - executive secretary of the Convention on Biological Diversity 
 Said Djinnit (born 1954) - United Nations diplomat
 Brahim Djamel Kassali (born 1954) -  Algerian Minister of Finance
 Khalida Toumi (born 1958) - feminist activist

See also
 List of colleges and universities
 List of universities in Algeria

References

External links
 University of Algiers Website 
 Faculty of Islamic Sciences 

 
1909 establishments in Algeria
Algeria
Buildings and structures in Algiers